This article lists incidents that have been termed ethnic cleansing by some academic or legal experts. Not all experts agree on every case, particularly since there are a variety of definitions of the term ethnic cleansing. When claims of ethnic cleansing are made by non-experts (e.g. journalists or politicians) they are noted.

Ancient, Medieval and Early Modern periods

Antiquity 
  146 BC: The Battle of Carthage was the main engagement of the Third Punic War between the Punic city of Carthage in what is now the country of Tunisia and the Roman Republic. It was a siege operation, starting sometime between 149 and 148 BC, and ending in the spring of 146 BC with the sack and complete destruction of the city of Carthage. In the spring of 146 BC, the Romans broke through the city wall. Eventually, after hours upon hours of house-to-house fighting, the Carthaginians surrendered.  An estimated 50,000 surviving inhabitants were sold into slavery. The city was then leveled. The land surrounding Carthage was eventually declared ager publicus (public land), and it was shared between local farmers, and Roman and Italian ones.
: During the Third Jewish-Roman War, Roman forces under the command of Hadrian killed over 580,000 Jews and razed over 985 Judean villages. The campaign has widely been described as a Genocide.
 350 AD: Ancient Chinese texts record that General Ran Min ordered the extermination of the Wu Hu, especially the Jie people, during the Wei–Jie war in the fourth century AD. People with racial characteristics such as high-bridged noses and bushy beards were killed; in total, 200,000 were reportedly massacred.

Middle Ages 
1069-1070 William the Conqueror devastated Northern England in what is now known as the Harrying of the North. During the Campaign, William pillaged and destroyed numerous towns and cities; destroying all of the region's food supplies with the intent to starve its population during the winter. Only a quarter of Northern England's population remained after the war. Some scholars have suggested that the Harrying of the North could qualify as a Genocide.
 1282 Sicilian Vespers (Italian: Vespri siciliani; Sicilian: Vespiri siciliani) is the name which is given to the successful rebellion which broke out on the island of Sicily on the Easter of 1282. The rebels sought to end the rule of the French/Capetian king Charles I, who had ruled the Kingdom of Sicily since 1266. Within six weeks, three thousand French men and women were slain by the rebels, and the government of King Charles lost control of the island. It was the beginning of the War of the Sicilian Vespers.
 1290 AD: Edward I of England expelled all of the Jews who were living in England in 1290. Hundreds of Jewish elders were executed.
 1250–1500 AD: From the 13th to the 16th century, many European countries expelled the Jews from their territories on at least 15 occasions. Spain's expulsion of the Jews was preceded by expulsions which occurred in England, France and some German states, along with expulsions which also occurred in many other countries, and it was succeeded by at least five more expulsions.

Renaissance 
 1492–1614 AD: As a result of religious persecution, up to a quarter million Jews in Spain converted to Catholicism, and those who refused (between 40,000 and 70,000) were expelled in 1492 following the Alhambra Decree. Those who did convert were subject to legal discrimination under the Limpieza de sangre system, which privileged Old Christians over New Christians. Suspicion of many of the converts continuing to practice Judaism, called Judaism in secret, led to the Inquisition. Shortly after the practice of Islam was outlawed and all of Spain's Muslims became nominally Christian. The descendants of these converted Muslims were called Moriscos. After the 1571 suppression of the Morisco Revolt in the Alpujarras region, almost 80,000 Moriscos were relocated to other parts of Spain and some 270 villages and hamlets were repopulated with settlers brought from other regions. This was followed by a general Expulsion of the Moriscos between 1609 and 1614 which was nominally applied to the entire Spanish realm, but was carried out most thoroughly in the eastern region of Valencia. Although its overall success in terms of implementation is subject to academic debate and did not involve widespread violence, it is considered one of the first episodes of state-sponsored ethnic cleansing in the modern western world.
1556–1620: Plantations of Ireland. Land in Laois, Offaly, Munster and parts of Ulster was seized by the English crown and colonised with English settlers. Ireland has been described as a "testing ground" for British colonialism, with the confiscation of land and expulsion of native Irish from their homelands being a rehearsal for the expulsion of the Native Americans by British settlers.
 1652 AD: After the Cromwellian conquest of Ireland and Act of Settlement in 1652, the whole post-war Cromwellian settlement of Ireland has been characterised by historians such as Mark Levene and Alan Axelrod as ethnic cleansing, in that it sought to remove Irish Catholics from the eastern part of the country, but others such as the historian Tim Pat Coogan have described the actions of Cromwell and his subordinates as genocide.
1755–1764 AD: During the French and Indian War, the Nova Scotia colonial government, aided by New England troops, instituted a systematic removal of the French Catholic Acadian population of Nova Scotia – eventually removing thousands of settlers from the region and relocating them to areas in the Thirteen Colonies, Britain and France. Many eventually moved and settled in Louisiana and became known as Cajuns. Many scholars have described the subsequent death of over 50% of the deported Acadian population as an ethnic cleansing.

19th century

 Jean-Jacques Dessalines, the first ruler of an independent Haiti, ordered the killing of the remaining white population of French creoles on Haiti by instigating the 1804 Haiti Massacre.
 On 26 May 1830, president Andrew Jackson of the United States signed the Indian Removal Act which resulted in the Trail of Tears.
Michael Mann, basing his figures on those provided by Justin McCarthy, states that between 1821 and 1922, a large number of Muslims were expelled from Southeast Europe as Bulgaria, Greece and Serbia gained their independence from the Ottoman Empire. Mann describes these events as "murderous ethnic cleansing on a stupendous scale not previously seen in Europe." These countries sought to expand their territory against the Ottoman Empire, which culminated in the Balkan Wars of the early 20th century. After each Russo-Turkish War, the Russians engaged in ethnic cleansing in the Caucasus. After the Russo-Turkish War (1877–1878) some 750,000 Ottoman Muslims disappeared from their native places. Some 210,000–310,000 civilian Bulgarians were slaughtered during the same war and the Bulgarian Horrors in 1876, and 100,000 fled. In the previous Russo-Turkish Wars as a result of voluntary migration and ethnic cleansing an emigrant community of Bessarabian Bulgarians was formed. Some 200,000 Bulgarians had emigrated from the Ottoman Empire between 1768 and 1812, until 1870 another 400,000 Bulgarians emigrated, mainly prompted by terror and ethnic cleansing in Thrace, while 200,000 were killed. Partly as a result of ethnic cleansing some 250,000 Bulgarians immigrated to Bulgaria from the Ottoman Empire between 1878 and 1912.

In 2005, the historian Gary Clayton Anderson of the University of Oklahoma published The Conquest of Texas: Ethnic Cleansing in the Promised Land, 1830–1875. This book repudiates traditional historians, such as Walter Prescott Webb and Rupert N. Richardson, who viewed the settlement of Texas by the displacement of the native populations as a healthful development. Anderson writes that at the time of the outbreak of the American Civil War, when the population of Texas was nearly 600,000, the still-new state was "a very violent place. ... Texans mostly blamed Indians for the violence – an unfair indictment, since a series of terrible droughts had virtually incapacitated the Plains Indians, making them incapable of extended warfare." The Conquest of Texas was nominated for a Pulitzer Prize.
 The nomadic Roma people have been expelled from European countries several times.
 The Russian Empire was the subject of several cases of ethnic and religious cleansing against minorities, specially Catholics (Poles and Lithuanians), Lutherans (Latvians and Estonians), Jews (Pale of Settlement) and Muslims. The heaviest event was the Circassian genocide in 1872.
 The Expulsion of the Albanians, 1877–1878 refers to events of forced migration of Albanian populations from areas that became incorporated into the Principality of Serbia and Principality of Montenegro in 1878. These wars, alongside the larger Russo-Ottoman War (1877–78) ended in defeat and substantial territorial losses for the Ottoman Empire which was formalised at the Congress of Berlin. This expulsion was part of the wider persecution of Muslims in the Balkans during the geopolitical and territorial decline of the Ottoman Empire. Although most of these Albanians were expelled by Serbian forces, a small presence was allowed to remain in the Jablanica valley where their descendants live today.
 From 1894 to 1896, in an effort to islamize the Ottoman Empire, Sultan Abdul Hamid II ordered the killing of ethnic Armenians (along with other Christian minorities) living in the Ottoman Empire, based on their religion. These killings later became known as the Hamidian massacres, named after Sultan Abdul Hamid II. It has been estimated that the total number of people killed ranges from 80,000 to 300,000.
 Beginning from about 1848, and extending into the 20th century, the residents of Silesia have been expelled by various governments as their homeland has come under the rule of different states.
 From 1885 and 1890, 30,000 ethnic Poles were expelled from Prussian state in the German Empire, due an anti-Polish and anti-Catholic sentiment in Prussian people and authorities.

20th century

1900s–1910s
The Herero and Namaqua genocide was a campaign of racial extermination and collective punishment that the German Empire undertook in German South West Africa (modern-day Namibia) against the Herero, Nama and San people. It is considered the first genocide of the 20th century. It took place between 1904 and 1907, during the Herero Wars.
During the Balkan Wars ethnic cleansings were carried out in Kosovo, Macedonia, Sanjak and Thrace, at first, they were committed against the Muslim population, but later, they were also committed against Christians, villages were burned and people were massacred. The Bulgarians, Serbs and Greeks burned villages and massacred Turkish civilians, but since then, the population of the Turkish-majority areas of the Bulgarian-occupied areas has remained almost unchanged. The Turks usually massacred Bulgarian and Greek males who lived in the areas which they reoccupied, but they did not massacre any Greeks during the Second Balkan War, the women and children were also raped and frequently slaughtered during each massacre. During the Second Balkan War, an ethnic cleansing campaign was carried out by the Ottoman Army and Turkish Bashi-bazouks exterminated the whole Bulgarian population of the Ottoman Adrianople Vilayet (an estimated 300,000 people before the war) and displacing the survivors of the massacres (60,000). Under Greek occupation, Bulgarian Macedonians were persecuted, expelled from their homes and forced to move to regions of Greece which are located north of the Bulgarian border. The Bulgarians had expelled 100,000 Greeks from Macedonia and West Thrace before the territories were returned to Greece.Massacres of Albanians in the Balkan Wars killed 25,000 of them. 18,000 Bulgarian civilians were killed in Macedonia but in Greek Macedonia, a quarter of the region's entire Muslim and Bulgarian population was spared. In addition to the dead, the aftermath of the war counts 890,000 people who permanently left their homes, of whom 400,000 fled to Turkey, 170,000 fled to Greece, 150,000 or 280,000 fled to Bulgaria. The population size of Bulgarians in Macedonia was mostly reduced by forceful assimilation campaigns through terror, following the ban of the use of the Bulgarian language and declarations which are named "Declare yourself a Serb or die.", signers were required to renounce their Bulgarian identity on paper in Serbia and Greece.
The 1914 Greek deportations have been described as an ethnic cleansing campaign by scholars Matthias Bjørnlund and Taner Akçam.
The Armenian genocide which occurred during World War I was implemented in two phases: the wholesale killing of the able-bodied male population through massacres and forced labor, and the deportation of women, children, the elderly and the infirm to the Syrian Desert on death marches. In addition to being described as a genocide, it is often described as an ethnic cleansing campaign in academic literature.
 The Bolshevik regime killed or deported an estimated 300,000 to 500,000 Don Cossacks during the Russian Civil War, in 1919–1920. Geoffrey Hosking stated "It could be argued that the Red policy towards the Don Cossacks amounted to ethnic cleansing. It was short-lived, however, and soon abandoned because it did not fit with normal Leninist theory and practice".

1920s–1930s
The Iraqi army waged a campaign of ethnic cleansing against Assyrian villagers who lived in northern Iraq with the assistance of Kurdish and Arab tribes. The number of deaths ranged from 600 to 3,000. Around one third of the Assyrians later sought refuge in Syria.
In 1920–21, the Greek army on the Yalova-Gemlik Peninsula burned dozens of Turkish/Muslim villages, engaging in large-scale violence and ethnic cleansing.
The Population exchange between Greece and Turkey has been described as an ethnic cleansing. In 1928, 1,104,216 Ottoman refugees were living in Greece. 400,000 Muslims left Greece. The Greek genocide resulted in the murder of 450,000–750,000 victims. 

Second Sino-Japanese War, in which the Imperial Japanese Army invaded China in the 1930s. More than 2.7 million Chinese were killed, civilians and military personnel alike. The Three Alls Policy ("Kill all, Burn all, Seize all") followed by the Imperial Japanese Army resulted in many of these deaths.
Pacification of Libya, Italian authorities committed ethnic cleansing in the Cyrenaica region of Libya by forcibly removing and relocating 100,000 people of the Cyrenaican indigenous population from their valuable land property that was slated to be given to Italian settlers.
The Chinese Kuomintang Generals Ma Qi and Ma Bufang launched campaigns of expulsion in Qinghai and Tibet against ethnic Tibetans. The actions of these Generals have been called Genocidal by some authors.
However, that was not the last Labrang saw of General Ma. In 1928, Ma Qi waged a war against the Tibetan Ngoloks, a war which author Dinesh Lal calls "genocidal", inflicting a defeat upon them and seizing the Labrang Buddhist monastery. The Muslim forces looted and ravaged the monastery again.
Authors Uradyn Erden Bulag called the events that follow as a Genocide while David Goodman named them ethnic cleansing: The Republic of China-supported Ma Bufang when he launched seven extermination expeditions into Golog, eliminating thousands of Tibetans. Some Tibetans counted the number of times he attacked them, remembering the seventh attack which made their lives impossible. Ma was highly anti-communist, and he and his army wiped out many Tibetans in the northeast and eastern Qinghai, and they also destroyed Tibetan Buddhist Temples.

The Holodomor (1932–1933) is considered by many historians as a genocidal famine perpetrated on the orders of Josef Stalin that involved widespread ethnic cleansing of ethnic Ukrainians in Soviet Ukraine. Food and grain were forcibly seized from villages, the internal borders between Soviet Ukraine and the Russian SSR were sealed in order to prevent population movement; movement between villages and urban centers was also restricted. Both before and after the famine, Stalin's destruction of ethnic Ukrainians was extended to the Ukrainian intelligentsia, the Ukrainian political elite and Ukrainian Party officials. A ban on the Ukrainian language and widespread Russification was also instilled. An estimated 2.5 to 8 million Ukrainians were exterminated in the famine. After their liquidation, Stalin repopulated the territory with ethnic Russians.
The Mexican Repatriation from 1929 to 1939 in which mass deportations and repatriations of Mexicans and Mexican Americans occurred in response to poverty and nativist fears which were triggered by the Great Depression in the United States has been called ethnic cleansing. An estimated forty to sixty percent of the 355,000 to 2 million people who were repatriated were birthright U.S. citizens - an overwhelming number of them were children. Voluntary repatriations were much more common than deportations. Legal scholar Kevin Johnson States that it meets modern legal standards for ethnic cleansing, arguing it involved the forced removal of an ethnic minority by the government.
The deportation of 172,000 Soviet Koreans by the Soviet government in September 1937, in which Koreans were moved away from the Korean border and deported to Central Asia, where they were made to do forced labor.

1940s

 The 1936-45 Romani genocide or the Porajmos: the killing of an estimated 130,565 Romani people by Nazi Germany, with some estimates ranging from 220,000 to 500,000.  
 The 1938-45 Holocaust : The killing of an estimated 6 million Jews by the government of Germany both inside Germany and throughout German occupied territories, and some of its independent allies such as the governments of Romania, Hungary, and Bulgaria (outside Bulgarian core territories).
 The 1941-45 Generalplan Ost by Nazi Germany, the massacre of almost all Central and Eastern European Jews, most Poles, Gypsies, Russian prisoners of war, along with an unknown but huge number of Russians, Byelorussians and Ukrainians in the German-occupied territories. It also resulted in millions of deaths in German extermination camps and the forced relocation of many civilians so German citizens could resettle in Eastern Europe. 
 The 1941 June deportation by the Soviet Union, deporting tens of thousands of people from occupied Estonia, Latvia, Lithuania and Poland to the farther reaches of the Soviet Union.
 The 1941 Farhud is the Name for the Violent Pogrom that engulfed Baghdad, Iraq, targeted against Iraqi Jews. The Massacre was inspired by Nazi-Orchestrated Pogroms such as Kristallnacht. The Violence was put to end after 2 days by British-backed Iraqi Militants.
Population transfers in the Soviet Union during and after World War II on the orders of Joseph Stalin, including the deportation of the Karachays, deportation of the Balkars, deportation of the Chechens and Ingush, deportation of the Meskhetian Turks and the deportation of the Kalmyks. Nearly 3.5 million ethnic minorities were resettled during 1940–52.
 The 1939-44 Expulsion of Poles by Nazi Germany and the Soviet Union following the defeat of Poland in the September Campaign.
 The deportation of Romanians from Bessarabia and Northern Bukovina (1940–1941, 1944–1951), by the USSR to Siberia and Central Asia.
 The deportation of nearly 200,000 Crimean Tatars on 18 May 1944 to the Uzbek SSR and other parts of the Soviet Union.
 The expulsion of 14 million ethnic Germans from the Former eastern territories of Germany after World War II. This policy was decided at the Potsdam Conference by the victorious powers.
 At least 330,000 Serbs, 30,000 Jews and 30,000 Roma, and 12,000 Croats and Bosniaks were killed during the NDH (see Jasenovac concentration camp) (today Croatia and Bosnia and Herzegovina). The same number of Serbs were forced out of the NDH, from May 1941 to May 1945. The Croatian Fascist regime managed to kill more than 45 000 Serbs, 12 000 or more Jews and approximately 16,000 Roma at the Jasenovac Concentration Camp.
 Chetnik atrocities against Bosniaks and Croats in Croatia and Bosnia and Herzegovina from 1941 to 1945 have been characterised as organised ethnic cleansing. It is estimated that around 32,000 Croats (20,000 from Croatia, and 12,000 from Bosnia) and 33,000 Bosniaks were killed.
 At least 40,000 Hungarian civilians were killed by Serbians in Vojvodina in an act of revenge (the so-called "Cold Days") in 1944.

 During World War II, in Kosovo and Metohija, approximately 10,000 Serbs were killed by Nazi German soldiers and Albanian collaborators, and about 80 to 100,000 or more were ethnically cleansed. After World War II, the new communist authorities of Yugoslavia banned Serbians and Montenegrins expelled during the war from returning to their abandoned estates.
 During the four years of wartime occupation from 1941 to 1944, the Axis (German, Hungarian and NDH) forces committed numerous war crimes against the civilian population of Serbs, Roma and Jews in the former Yugoslavia: about 50,000 people in Vojvodina (north Serbia) (see Occupation of Vojvodina, 1941–1944) were murdered and about 280,000 were arrested, raped or tortured. The total number of people killed under Hungarian occupation in Bačka was 19,573, in Banat 7,513 (under German occupation) and in Syrmia 28,199 (under Croatian occupation).
During the Axis occupation of Albania (1943–1944), the Albanian collaborationist organization Balli Kombëtar with Nazi German support mounted a major offensive in southern Albania (Northern Epirus) with devastating results: over 200 Greek populated towns and villages were burned down or destroyed, 2,000 ethnic Greeks were killed, 5,000 imprisoned and 2,000 forced to concentration camps. Moreover, 30,000 people had to flee to nearby Greece during and after this period.
 Towards the end of World War II, nearly 14,000–25,000 ethnic Albanian Muslims were expelled from the coastal region of Epirus in northwestern Greece by the EDES paramilitary organization, supported by the state.
During the Partition of India 6 million Muslims fled ethnic violence taking place in India to settle in what became Pakistan (and by 1971, Bangladesh) and 5 million Hindus and Sikhs fled from what became Pakistan and Bangladesh, to settle in India. The events which occurred during this time period have been described as ethnic cleansing by Ishtiaq Ahmed and by Barbara and Thomas R. Metcalf.
 In 1947, the Jammu Massacre took place. The event has been described as ethnic cleansing of Muslims in the Jammu region of Jammu and Kashmir.
 After the Republic of Indonesia achieved independence from the Netherlands in 1949, around 300,000 people, predominantly Indos, or people of mixed Indonesian and Dutch ancestry, fled or were expelled.
 The 1949 March deportation by the Soviet Union, deporting tens of thousands of people from occupied Estonia, Latvia and Lithuania to the farther reaches of the Soviet Union.
 In the aftermath of the 1949 Durban Riots (an inter-racial conflict between Zulus and Indian South Africans), hundreds of Indians fled Cato Manor.
 In Ethiopia the Harari Muslims peacefully protested against religious oppression, however the state responded violently. Hundreds were arrested and the entire town of Harar was put under house arrest. The government also took control of many assets and estates belonging to the people. These events broke the Harari control of the city of Harar and 10,000 Hararis left the city.
 Italian war crimes against Slavs (particularly Croats and Slovenes), both within pre-war Italy and during World War II in Yugoslavia, such as the mass-killing of civilians, including within concentration camps, have also been classed as acts of ethnic cleansing. A particular example was Mario Roatta's war on the ethnic Slovene civil population in the Province of Ljubljana during Fascist Italy's occupation of Yugoslavia in accord with the 1920s speech by Benito Mussolini's speech: 
 Foibe massacres against Italians
More than 700,000 Palestinian Arabs – about half of prewar Palestine's Arab population – fled or were expelled from their homes during the 1947-1949 Palestine war, and between 400 and 600 Palestinian villages were destroyed. During the same conflict, the Jordanian Army also besieged the Jewish Quarter of Jerusalem, prompting the approximately 2000 Jews living there to flee.

1950s

 From 5–6 September 1955, the Istanbul pogrom or "Septembrianá"/"Σεπτεμβριανά", secretly backed by the Turkish government, was launched against the Greek population of Istanbul. The mob also attacked some Jewish and Armenian residents of the city.  The event contributed greatly to the gradual extinction of the Greek minority in the city and throughout the entire country, which numbered 100,000 in 1924 after the Turko-Greek population exchange treaty.  By 2006 there were only 2,500 Greeks living in Istanbul.
The Jewish exodus from Muslim countries, the flight of over 850,000 Jews of the Islamic world, mainly Mizrahi and Sephardic. Many Arab governments, such as Gaddafi's Libya, Nasserist Egypt, and Hafez al-Assad's Syria, confiscated Jewish bank accounts and property of Jews who had departed, in addition to placing laws restricting Jewish business. Several pogroms across the Arab world, possibly state-encouraged, harassed and threatened thousands of Jews into leaving their countries for Western nations, particularly Israel.

1960s
 On 5 July 1960, five days after the Congo gained independence from Belgium, the Force Publique garrison near Léopoldville mutinied against its white officers and attacked numerous European targets. This caused fear amongst the approximately 100,000 whites still resident in the Congo and led to their mass exodus from the country.
 Ne Win's rise to power in 1962 and his relentless persecution of "resident aliens" (immigrant groups not recognised as citizens of the Union of Burma) led to an exodus of some 300,000 Burmese Indians.  They migrated to escape racial discrimination and wholesale nationalisation of private enterprises a few years later in 1964.
 As the FLN fought for the independence of Algeria from France, it expelled the Pied-Noir population of European descent and Jews; most fled to France, where they had citizenship. In just a few months in 1962, 900,000 of these European descendants and native Jews had left the country.
 The 1962 Rajshahi massacres in East Pakistan (modern-day Bangladesh) witnessed the killing of minorities, mostly Buddhists and Hindus, by Muslims. More than 3,000 non-Muslims were killed. In 1958, Ayub Khan came to power in Pakistan, and from the beginning the policy of the Ayub Regime was to cleanse East Pakistan of Bengali Hindus and other minorities. There was also arson, rapes, and looting. This ethnic cleansing campaign resulted in the migration of 11,000 Santhals and Rajbanshis to India.
 Zanzibar expelled Arabs and Indians from the nation in 1964.
 In 1964, the 1964 East Pakistan Riots occurred which resulted in more than 10,000 Bengali Hindus being targeted and systematically killed by Bengali Muslims. In the village of Mainam near Nagaon in Rajshahi District all Hindus except 2 little girls were massacred. This resulted in more than 135,000 refugees. Hundreds of villages around Dhaka city were burnt to ashes. This left more than 100,000 Hindus homeless. 95% of the ruined houses belonged to Hindus who lived in Old Dhaka.
 In 1966, there was unrest in the northern part of Nigeria that led to the death of about 80,000 people. Those killed were originally from the South Eastern region of the country and this act was seen as an attack on the Igbo people. This led C. Odumegwu Ojukwu, the military governor of the Eastern region, to declare that region a Sovereign state, Biafra. The Nigerian Civil War began on 6 July 1967, but ended in 1970 with the help of the United Kingdom and China. Although there is relative peace in Nigeria, today, there is still some religious unrest in the North being caused by the Boko Haram group.
The expulsion of the Chagossians from the Chagos Archipelago by the United Kingdom, at the request of the United States in order to establish a military base, started in 1968 and concluded in 1973.

1970s
 On 7 October 1970, shortly after Muammar Gaddafi came to power in Libya, the Libyan government forcibly expelled some 20,000 Italians who were living in the country, in retaliation for Italy's 1911 colonization of the country. Thousands of Italians had all of their property and rights confiscated, and at the same time the Libyan government expropriated the property of Libyan Jews who had previously left the country in the wake of the Arab-Israeli wars. In Libya, the expulsion was commemorated with a holiday known as the "Day of Revenge".
 During the Bangladesh War of Independence of 1971, the military of Pakistan carried out genocide killing between 300,000 and 3 million people and around 10 million Bengalis, mainly Hindus, fled the country. Additionally, many died in the poorly and hastily setup refugee camps in India. Furthermore, many intellectuals and other religious minorities were targeted by death squads and razakars. Thousands of temples were desecrated and thousands of women were raped.
 Idi Amin's regime forced the expulsion in 1972 of Uganda's entire ethnic Asian population, mostly of Indian descent.
 There was an ethnic cleansing of the Greek population of the areas under Turkish military occupation in Cyprus in 1974–76 during and after the Turkish invasion of Cyprus. This has been the subject of litigation in the European Court of Human Rights in cases including Loizidou v. Turkey and the European Court of Justice in cases like Apostolides v Orams.
 Following the U.S. withdrawal from South Vietnam in 1973 and the communist victory two years later, the Kingdom of Laos's coalition government was overthrown by the communists. The Hmong people, who had actively supported the anti-communist government, became targets of retaliation and persecution. The government of Laos has been accused of committing Genocide against the Hmong, with up to 100,000 killed.
 The Communist Khmer Rouge government in Cambodia disproportionately targeted ethnic minority groups, including ethnic Chinese, Vietnamese and Thais. In the late 1960s, an estimated 425,000 ethnic Chinese lived in Cambodia; by 1984, as a result of Khmer Rouge genocide and emigration, only about 61,400 Chinese remained in the country. The small Thai minority along the border was almost completely exterminated, only a few thousand managing to reach safety in Thailand. The Muslim Cham Minority suffered serious purges with as much as 80% of their population exterminated. The Khmer's racial supremacist ideology was responsible to this ethnic purge. A Khmer Rouge order stated that henceforth "The Cham nation no longer exists on Kampuchean soil belonging to the Khmers" (U.N. Doc. A.34/569 at 9).
 Subsequent waves of hundreds of thousands of Rohingya fled Burma and many refugees inundated neighbouring Bangladesh including 250,000 in 1978 as a result of the Operation Dragon King in Arakan.
 The Sino-Vietnamese War resulted in the discrimination and consequent migration of Vietnam's ethnic Chinese. Many of these people fled as "boat people". In 1978–79, some 250,000 ethnic Chinese left Vietnam by boat as refugees (many officially encouraged and assisted) or were expelled across the land border with China.

1980s
 In 1983, in Sri Lanka, Anti-Tamil Riots erupted over the City of Colombo, the Chief Target being Tamil businessmen. 
 In the aftermath of Indira Gandhi's assassination in 1984, the ruling party Indian National Congress supporters formed large mobs and killed around 15000–30000 Sikhs around Delhi in what is known as the 1984 Anti-Sikh Riots during the next four days. The mobs acting with the support of ruling party leaders used the Election voting list to identify Sikhs and kill them.
In the 1987 and 1988 Anfal campaign, the Iraqi government under Saddam Hussein and headed by Ali Hassan al-Majid launched Al-Anfal against Kurdish civilians in Northern Iraq. The Iraqi government Massacred 100,000 to 182,000 non-combatant civilians including women and children, and destroyed about 4,000 villages (out of 4,655) in Iraqi Kurdistan. Between April 1987 and August 1988, 250 towns and villages were exposed to chemical weapons, 1,754 schools were destroyed, along with 270 hospitals, 2,450 mosques, 27 churches; and around 90% of all Kurdish villages in the targeted areas were wiped out.
 Between 16 and 17 March 1988, the Iraqi government under Saddam Hussein carried out a poison gas attack in the Kurdish town of Halabja in Iraqi Kurdistan. Between 3,200 and 5,000 civilians died instantly, and between 7,000 and 10,000 civilians were injured, and thousands more would die in the following years from complications, diseases, and birth defects caused by the attack.
 The forced assimilation campaign during 1984–1985 directed against ethnic Turks by the Bulgarian State resulted in the mass emigration of some 360,000 Bulgarian Turks to Turkey in 1989 has been characterized as ethnic cleansing.
 The Nagorno-Karabakh conflict has resulted in the displacement of populations from both sides. Among the displaced are 700,000 Azerbaijanis and several Kurds from ethnic Armenian-controlled territories including Armenia and areas of Nagorno-Karabakh, more than 353,000 Armenians were forced to flee from territories controlled by Azerbaijan plus some 80,000 had to flee Armenian border territories.
 Since April 1989, some 70,000 black Mauritanians – members of the Fula, Toucouleur, Wolof, Soninke and Bambara ethnic groups – have been expelled from Mauritania by the Mauritanian government.
 In 1989, after bloody pogroms against the Meskhetian Turks by Uzbeks in Central Asia's Ferghana Valley, nearly 90,000 Meskhetian Turks left Uzbekistan.

1990s

 In 1990, inter-ethnic tensions escalated in Bhutan, resulting in the flight of many Lhotshampa, or ethnic Nepalis, from Bhutan to Nepal, many of whom were expelled by the Bhutanese military. By 1996, over 100,000 Bhutanese refugees were living in refugee camps in Nepal. Many have since been resettled in Western nations. One reason for this expulsion was the desire of the Bhutanese government to remove a largely Hindu population and preserve its Buddhist culture and identity.
 In 1991, as part of the First Nagorno-Karabakh War, during Operation Ring, Soviet troops and the predominantly Azerbaijani soldiers in the AzSSR OMON and army forcibly uprooted Armenians living in the 24 villages strewn across Shahumyan to leave their homes and settle elsewhere in Nagorno-Karabakh or in the neighboring Armenian SSR. Human rights organizations documented a wide number of human rights violations and abuses committed by Soviet and Azerbaijani forces and many of them properly characterised them as ethnic cleansing. These violations and abuses included forced deportations of civilians, unlawful killings, torture, kidnapping harassment, rape and the wanton seizure or destruction of property. Despite fierce protests, no measures were taken either to prevent the human rights abuses or to punish the perpetrators. Approximately 17,000 Armenians living in twenty-three of Shahumyan's villages were deported out of the region.
 In 1991, following a major crackdown on Rohingya Muslims in Burma, 250,000 refugees took shelter in the Cox's Bazar district of neighboring Bangladesh.
 After the Gulf War in 1991, Kuwait conducted a campaign of expulsion against the Palestinians living in the country, who before the war had numbered 400,000. Some 200,000 who had fled during the Iraqi occupation were banned from returning, while the remaining 200,000 were pressured into leaving by the authorities, who conducted a campaign of terror, violence, and economic pressure to get them to leave. The Kuwaiti Palestinians expelled from Kuwait moved to Jordan, where they had citizenship. The policy which partly led to this exodus was a response to the alignment of PLO leader Yasser Arafat with Saddam Hussein.
 As a result of the 1991–1992 South Ossetia War, about 100,000 ethnic Ossetians fled South Ossetia and Georgia proper, most across the border into North Ossetia. A further 23,000 ethnic Georgians fled South Ossetia and settled in other parts of Georgia.
 According to Helsinki Watch, the campaign of ethnic-cleansing was orchestrated by the Ossetian militants, during the events of the Ossetian–Ingush conflict, which resulted in the expulsion of approximately 60,000 Ingush inhabitants from Prigorodny District.

 The widespread ethnic cleansing accompanying the Croatian War of Independence that was committed by Serb-led Yugoslav People's Army (JNA) and rebel militia in the occupied areas of Croatia (self-proclaimed Republic of Serbian Krajina) (1991–1995). Large numbers of Croats and non-Serbs were removed, either by murder, deportation or by being forced to flee. According to the ICTY indictment against Slobodan Milošević, there was an expulsion of around 170,000 to 250,000 Croats and other non-Serbs from their home, in addition to an estimated 10,000 Croats that were also killed. Also, around 10,000 Croats left Vojvodina in 1992 due to persecution by Serb nationalists. Milan Martić, Milan Babić and Vojislav Šešelj were convicted by the International Criminal Tribunal for the former Yugoslavia (ICTY) for persecution on racial, ethnic or religious ground, deportation and/or forcible displacement as a crime against humanity.
 In February 1992, hundreds of ethnic Azeris and Meskhetian Turks are massacred as Armenian troops capture the city of Khojaly in Nagorno-Karabakh.
Widespread ethnic cleansing accompanied the War in Bosnia (1992–1995). Large numbers of Croats and Bosniaks were forced to flee their homes by the Army of the Republika Srpska, large numbers of Serbs and Bosniaks by the Croatian Defence Council and Serbs and Croats by the Army of Bosnia and Herzegovina. Beginning in 1991, political upheavals in the Balkans displaced about 2,700,000 people by mid-1992, of which over 700,000 sought asylum in other parts of Europe. In September 1994, UNHCR representatives estimated around 80,000 non-Serbs out of 837,000 who initially lived on the Serb-controlled territory of Bosnia and Herzegovina before the war remained there; an estimated removal of 90% of the Bosniak and Croat inhabitants of Serb-coveted territory, almost all of whom were deliberately forced out of their homes. It also includes ethnic cleansing of non-Croats in the breakaway state the Croatian Republic of Herzeg-Bosnia The ICTY convicted several officials for persecution, forced transfer and/or deportation, including Momčilo Krajišnik, Radoslav Brđanin, Stojan Župljanin, Mićo Stanišić, Biljana Plavšić, Radovan Karadžić and Ratko Mladić.
 Exodus of between 100,000 and 200,000 Krajina Serbs during and after the Croatian Army's Operation Storm. Some investigators and academics describe this event as ethnic cleansing. Historian Marko Attila Hoare disagrees that the operation was an act of ethnic cleansing, and points out that the Krajina Serb leadership evacuated the civilian population as a response to the Croatian offensive; whatever their intentions, the Croatians never had the chance to organise their removal.  The ICTY indicted Croatian generals Ante Gotovina, Ivan Čermak and Mladen Markač for war crimes for their roles in the operation, charging them with participating in a joint criminal enterprise (JCE) aimed at the permanent removal of Serbs from the Republic of Serbian Krajina (RSK) held part of Croatia. Gotovina and Markač were convicted and Čermak was acquitted in April 2011. In November 2012, the ICTY Appeals Chamber acquitted Gotovina and Markač, reversing its earlier judgement by a 3–2 decision. The Appeals Chamber ruled that there was insufficient evidence to conclude the existence of a joint criminal enterprise to remove Serb civilians by force and further stated that while the Croatian Army and Special Police committed crimes after the artillery assault, the state and military leadership could not be held responsible for their planning and creation.

 At least 700,000 Kosovo Albanians were deported from Kosovo between 1998 and 1999 during the Kosovo War. The ICTY convicted several officials for persecution, forced displacement and/or deportation, including Nikola Šainović, Dragoljub Ojdanić and Nebojša Pavković.
 In the aftermath of Kosovo War between 200,000 and 250,000 Serbs and other non-Albanians fled Kosovo.
 The forced displacement and ethnic-cleansing of more than 250,000 people, mostly Georgians but some others too, from Abkhazia during the conflict and after in 1993 and 1998.
 The mass expulsion of southern Lhotshampas (Bhutanese of Nepalese origin) by the northern Druk majority in Bhutan in 1990. The number of refugees is approximately 103,000.
 In October 1990, the militant Liberation Tigers of Tamil Eelam (LTTE), forcibly expelled the entire Muslim population (approx 65,000) from the Northern Province of Sri Lanka. The Muslims were given 48 hours to vacate the premises of their homes while their properties were subsequently looted by LTTE. Those who refused to leave were killed.
 In Jammu and Kashmir, a separatist insurgency has targeted the Hindu Kashmiri Pandit minority and 400,000 have been displaced, and 1,200 have been killed since 1991. Islamic terrorists infiltrated the region in 1989 and began an ethnic cleansing campaign to convert Kashmir to a Muslim state.  Since that time, over 400,000 Kashmiri Hindus have either been murdered or forced from their homes. This has been condemned and labeled as ethnic cleansing in a 2006 resolution passed by the United States Congress. Also in 2009 the Oregon Legislative Assembly introduced a resolution to recognize 14 September 2007, as Martyrs Day to acknowledge the ethnic cleansing and the campaigns of terror inflicted on the non-Muslim minorities of Jammu and Kashmir by militants seeking to establish an independent Kashmir, and also to recognize the region as Indian territory rather than as a disputed territory – the resolution failed to pass.
 The May 1998 riots of Indonesia targeted many Chinese Indonesians. Suffering from looting and arson many Chinese Indonesians fled from Indonesia.
 There have been serious outbreaks of inter-ethnic violence on the island of Kalimantan since 1997, involving the indigenous Dayak peoples and immigrants from the island of Madura. In 2001 in the Central Kalimantan town of Sampit, at least 500 Madurese were killed and up to 100,000 Madurese were forced to flee. Some Madurese bodies were decapitated in a ritual reminiscent of the headhunting tradition of the Dayaks of old.

21st century

2000s 
 In 2003, Sinafasi Makelo, a representative of Mbuti Pygmies, told the UN's Indigenous People's Forum that during the Congo Civil War, his people were hunted down and eaten as though they were game animals. Both sides of the war regarded them as "subhuman" and some say their flesh can confer magical powers. Makelo asked the UN Security Council to recognize cannibalism as a crime against humanity and an act of genocide.
 From the late 1990s to the early 2000s, Indonesian paramilitaries organized and armed by Indonesian military and police killed or expelled large numbers of civilians in East Timor. After the East Timorese people voted for independence in a 1999 referendum, Indonesian paramilitaries retaliated, murdering Separatists and levelling most towns. More than 200,000 people either fled or were forcibly taken to Indonesia before East Timor achieved full independence. 
 Since the mid-1990s the central government of Botswana has been trying to move Bushmen also known as the Saan, out of the Central Kalahari Game Reserve. As of October 2005, the government has resumed its policy of forcing all Bushmen off their lands in the Game Reserve, using armed police and threats of violence or death. Many of the involuntarily displaced Bushmen live in squalid resettlement camps and some have resorted to prostitution and alcoholism, while about 250 others remain or have surreptitiously returned to the Kalahari to resume their independent lifestyle. Festus Mogae defended the Actions, saying, "How can we continue to have Stone Age creatures in an age of computers?"
 Since 2003, Sudan has been widely accused of carrying out a Genocide Campaign against several black ethnic groups in Darfur, in response to a rebellion by Africans alleging mistreatment. Sudanese irregular militia known as the Janjaweed and Sudanese military and police forces have killed an estimated 450,000, expelled around two million, and burned 800 villages. A 14 July 2007 article notes that in the past two months up to 75,000 Arabs from Chad and Niger crossed the border into Darfur. Most have been relocated by the Sudanese government to former villages of displaced non-Arab people. Some 450,000 have been killed and 2.5 million have now been forced to flee to refugee camps in Chad after their homes and villages were destroyed. Sudan refuses to allow their return, or to allow United Nations peacekeepers into Darfur.
At least one additional thousand Serbs fled their homes during the 2004 unrest in Kosovo and numerous religious and cultural objects were burned down.
During the Iraq Civil War and consequent Iraqi insurgency (2011-2013), entire neighborhoods in Baghdad were ethnically cleansed by Shia and Sunni militias. Some areas were evacuated by every member of a particular group due to lack of security, moving into new areas because of fear of reprisal killings. As of 21 June 2007, the United Nations High Commissioner for Refugees estimated that 2.2 million Iraqis had been displaced to neighboring countries, and 2 million were displaced internally, with nearly 100,000 Iraqis fleeing to Syria and Jordan each month.
Assyrian exodus from Iraq from 2003 until present is often described as ethnic cleansing. Although Iraqi Christians represent less than 5% of the total Iraqi population, they make up 40% of the refugees now living in nearby countries, according to UNHCR. In the 16th century, Christians constituted half of Iraq's population. In 1987, the last Iraqi census counted 1.4 million Christians. Following the 2003 invasion and the resultant growth of militant Islamism, Christians' total numbers slumped to about 500,000, of whom 250,000 live in Baghdad. Furthermore, the Mandaean and Yazidi communities are at the risk of elimination due to the ongoing atrocities by Islamic extremists. A 25 May 2007 article notes that in the past 7 months only 69 people from Iraq have been granted refugee status in the United States.
In October 2006, Niger announced that it would deport Arabs living in the Diffa region of eastern Niger to Chad. This population numbered about 150,000. Nigerien government forces forcibly rounded up Arabs in preparation for deportation, during which two girls died, reportedly after fleeing government forces, and three women suffered miscarriages. Niger's government eventually suspended the plan.
In 1950, the Karen had become the largest of 20 minority groups participating in an insurgency against the military dictatorship in Burma. The conflict continues as of 2008. In 2004, the BBC, citing aid agencies, estimates that up to 200,000 Karen have been driven from their homes during decades of war, with 120,000 more refugees from Burma, mostly Karen, living in refugee camps on the Thai side of the border. Many accuse the military government of Burma of ethnic cleansing. As a result of the ongoing war in minority group areas more than two million people have fled Burma to Thailand.
Civil unrest in Kenya erupted in December 2007. By 28 January 2008, the death toll from the violence was at around 800. The United Nations estimated that as many as 600,000 people have been displaced. A government spokesman claimed that Odinga's supporters were "engaging in ethnic cleansing".
The 2008 attacks on North Indians in Maharashtra began on 3 February 2008. Incidences of violence against North Indians and their property were reported in Mumbai, Pune, Aurangabad, Beed, Nashik, Amravati, Jalna and Latur. Nearly 25,000 North Indian workers fled Pune, and another 15,000 fled Nashik in the wake of the attacks.
South Africa Ethnic Cleansing erupted on 11 May 2008 within three weeks 80 000 were displaced the death toll was 62, with 670 injured in the violence when South Africans ejected non-nationals in a nationwide ethnic cleansing/xenophobic outburst. The most affected foreigners have been Somalis, Ethiopians, Indians, Pakistanis, Zimbabweans and Mozambiqueans. Local South Africans have also been caught up in the violence. Arvin Gupta, a senior UNHCR protection officer, said the UNHCR did not agree with the City of Cape Town that those displaced by the violence should be held at camps across the city. During the 2010 FIFA world cup, rumors were reported that xenophobic attacks will be commenced after the final. A few incidents occurred where foreign individuals were targeted, but the South African police claims that these attacks can not be classified as xenophobic attacks but rather as regular criminal activity in the townships. Elements of the South African Army were sent into the affected townships to assist the police in keeping order and preventing continued attacks.
In August 2008, the 2008 South Ossetia war broke out when Georgia launched a military offensive against South Ossetian separatists, leading to military intervention by Russia, during which Georgian forces were expelled from the separatist territories of South Ossetia and Abkhazia. During the fighting, 15,000 ethnic Georgians living in South Ossetia were forced to flee to Georgia proper, and Ossetian militias burned their villages to the Ground in order to prevent their return.

2010s 

Strategic demographic and cultural cleansing by the Sinhala Buddhist majority of the Muslim and Tamil minorities in Sri Lanka.

The killing of hundreds of ethnic Uzbeks in Kyrgyzstan during the 2010 South Kyrgyzstan ethnic clashes resulting in the flight of thousands of Uzbek refugees to Uzbekistan have been called ethnic cleansing by the Organization for Security and Co-operation in Europe and international media.
The black Libyan tribe of Tawergha town de-populated by Anti-Gaddafi forces following the Battle of Tawergha in 2011.
Since the start of the Syrian Civil War, Hezbollah, a Lebanon-based Shi'ite political movement, which is allied with pro-government forces, has been accused of ethnic cleansing against the Sunni majority.
Members of the Azusa 13 gang, associated with the Mexican Mafia, were accused of attempting a racial cleansing of African Americans in Azusa, California.
2012 Rakhine State riots. An estimated 90,000 people have been displaced in the recent sectarian violence between Rohingya Muslims and Buddhists in Burma's western Rakhine State.
Approximately 400,000 people have been displaced in the 2012 Assam ethnic violence between indigenous Bodos and Bengali-speaking Muslims in Assam, India.
Sources inside the Syriac Orthodox Church have reported that an ongoing ethnic cleansing of Syrian Christians is being carried out by anti-government rebels.
Central African Republic Civil War. More than 1 million have been internally displaced.
As part of a campaign of ethnic cleansing against Rohingya Muslims, more than 50 people were killed in the 2013 Myanmar anti-Muslim riots.
South Sudanese Civil War. More than 700,000 have been internally displaced. Part of Ethnic violence in South Sudan.
In 2015, Turkish Prime Minister Ahmet Davutoglu publicly accused Russia and Syria of ethnic cleansing against the Syrian Turkmen minority. Only a few thousand Turkmen now live in Syria, in contrast to the 200,000-300,000 Turks who lived there before the Syrian Civil War. Thousands of Turkmen villagers have fled the country to escape Russian bombing. The minority also faced persecution prior to the war; and denied to speak their dialect.
In 2017 a new wave of government sanctioned ethnic cleansing against Rohingya Muslims amounting to genocide with thousands killed and many villages burned to the ground with their inhabitants executed has been reported in Myanmar, to the extent that children have reported to be beheaded or burned alive by the Myanmar military and Buddhist vigilantes.
The ongoing Turkish occupation of northern Syria has seen ethnic cleansing of Kurds, Christians, Yazidis, and other minorities, especially in the Afrin District, where 150,000–300,000 Kurds were displaced. The Turkish state has been resettling Afrin with Arab Syrian refugees.
The Uyghur genocide has involved a campaign of ethnic cleansing orchestrated by the Chinese government against the Uyghur people and other ethnic and religious minorities in and around the Xinjiang Uyghur Autonomous Region (XUAR) of the People's Republic of China.  Since 2014, the Chinese government, under the direction of the Chinese Communist Party (CCP) during the administration of CCP general secretary Xi Jinping, has pursued policies leading to more than one million Muslims (the majority of them Uyghurs) being held in secretive internment camps without any legal process in what has become the largest-scale and most systematic detention of ethnic and religious minorities since the Holocaust.

2020s 

 The War in Tigray has been described as an ongoing ethnic cleansing perpetrated by Ethiopia against ethnic Tigrayans. New IDs have been prescribed to Tigrayans, and many Tigrayans living in other Ethiopian regions have been subject to "ethnically selective purges." Ethiopia has also weaponized famine as a key war tactic in Tigray, leaving an estimated 90% of the population vulnerable to famine. All electricity has been cut off by Ethiopia, cutting off Tigray's communication with the outside world. One schoolteacher recalled, "Even if someone was dead, they shot them again, dozens of times. I saw this. I saw many bodies, even priests. They killed all Tigrayans."
 During the 2022 Russian invasion of Ukraine, reports indicated that between 900,000 and 1.6 million Ukrainians on the Russian-occupied territories were deported to Russia, including 260,000 children. At least 18 filtration camps were established along the Russian border to facilitate this transfer. These crimes were alleged to be a form of depopulation and ethnic cleansing of Ukraine by the Russian military on the order of Russia's leader Vladimir Putin.

See also 

 Expulsions and exoduses of Jews
 Genocides in history
 List of ethnic riots
 List of expulsions of African Americans
 List of events named massacres
 List of genocides
 Population transfer in the Soviet Union

References

Further reading
 Bibliography of Genocide studies

Forced migration
Human rights abuses
Persecution
Discrimination
Genocide